Zwijndrecht is a town and municipality in the western Netherlands. It is located in the province of South Holland, at the southern tip of the island of IJsselmonde, and at the confluence of the rivers Oude Maas, Beneden-Merwede, and Noord.

Population
The town of Zwijndrecht is one of the "Drecht" cities. Part of the suburban zone south of Rotterdam, it has grown from around 6,000 inhabitants in 1960, to about 45,000 today.

Since 2003, the municipality of Zwijndrecht also includes the villages of Heerjansdam and Kleine-Lindt.

Zwijndrecht has the highest concentration of Estonians in the Netherlands.

The Evangelical Theological Academy is located here.

Transportation
The town is served by a railway station of the same name (Station Zwijndrecht).

By train you go north to Rotterdam and The Hague, and south it takes you to either Breda or Roosendaal.

Water bus routes 21 and 24 both stop at (Zwijndrecht Veerplein), connecting it with the following:
Dordrecht Merwekade
Dordrecht Hooikade

The road buses are operated by Qbuzz. Routes connect to Dordrecht, Rotterdam and other places in the Drechtsteden.

Also Zwijndrecht is an important town for cargo transportation. It connects highways together with highway A16 and it connects rivers together with river De Oude Maas. Even for train cargo they have an important connection. For train cargo there is a classification yard that's called Kijfhoek, It's one of the most important and biggest classification yards in Europe.

Twin cities 
Zwijndrecht is currently twinned with:

Notable people 
 Peter van Dalen (born 1958) politician and Member of the European Parliament* Mohammed Benzakour (born 1972) a Moroccan-Dutch columnist, essayist, poet, writer and politician
 Nicolay (born Matthijs Rook in 1974) electronica, R&B and hip hop record producer 
 Ralph Barendse (born 1977) a DJ and producer of electronic dance music
 Martijn Lakemeier (born 1993) actor

Sport 
 Michel Valke (born 1959) retired Dutch footballer
 Jeroen Sluijter (born 1975) baseball player
 Percy Isenia (born 1976) baseball player
 Kevin Vermeulen (born 1990) professional footballer
 Marten de Roon (born 1991) professional footballer
 Nikki de Roest (born 1993) educator and formerly a female association football player
 Jordy van Deelen (born 1993) footballer

Gallery

See also
Meerdervoort

References

External links

 Official website

 
Municipalities of South Holland
Populated places in South Holland
Drechtsteden
IJsselmonde (island)